The Hope Lodge No. 145 is a historic Freemasons lodge located at 116 East Vermilion Street in Lafayette, Louisiana.

Built in 1916, it is a two-story brick structure with a five-bay facade and a pair of entrances. The lodge was chartered on February 10, 1857. In the same year former Governor Alexandre Mouton donated the site in which the original building was located. In 1916, due to growing membership, the previous building was demolished to make space for the current building.

The building was listed on the National Register of Historic Places on January 21, 1983.

See also
 National Register of Historic Places listings in Lafayette Parish, Louisiana

References

Lafayette Parish, Louisiana
Masonic Lodges
Freemasonry in the United States
National Register of Historic Places in Lafayette Parish, Louisiana